Penetrator may refer to:

 A penetration fighter that operates at long range over enemy airspace, or the related bomber version
 Penetrator (album), a 1984 album by Ted Nugent
 Penetrator (video game), a 1982 Sinclair ZX video game
 Penetrator (play), a 1993 play by Anthony Neilson